Bothromesostoma is a genus of flatworms belonging to the family Typhloplanidae.

The species of this genus are found in Europe.

Species:
Bothromesostoma essenii Braun, 1885 
 Bothromesostoma evelinae Marcus, 1946 
Bothromesostoma personatum Schmidt, 1848

References

Rhabdocoela
Platyhelminthes genera